Ferenc Csongrádi (born 29 March 1956) is a Hungarian football manager and former player who played at both professional and international levels as a midfielder.

Career
Born in Apácatorna, Csongrádi played club football for Videoton.

He also earned 24 caps for the Hungarian national team between 1976 and 1984, representing them at the 1982 FIFA World Cup.

References

1956 births
Living people
Hungarian footballers
Hungary international footballers
1982 FIFA World Cup players
Fehérvár FC players
Veszprém LC footballers
Győri ETO FC players
Hungarian football managers
Fehérvár FC managers
FC Sopron managers
Gázszer FC managers
Sportspeople from Veszprém County
Association football midfielders
Nemzeti Bajnokság I managers